Anapisa histrio is a moth of the family Erebidae. It was described by Sergius G. Kiriakoff in 1963. It is found in Angola, the Democratic Republic of the Congo and Kenya.

References

Moths described in 1963
Syntomini
Erebid moths of Africa
Insects of West Africa